is a Japanese former Nippon Professional Baseball infielder and current manager of the Fukuoka SoftBank Hawks.

He previously played for the Nankai/Fukuoka Daiei Hawks and the Orix Blue Wave.

Early baseball career
Fujimoto went on to Tenri High School, where he competed in the 62nd Japanese High School Baseball Championship in the summer of his sophomore year.

Professional career

Active player era
On November 25, 1981, Fujimoto was drafted by the Nankai Hawks in the 1981 Nippon Professional Baseball draft.

On July 7, 1990, He accomplished hit for the cycle against the Nippon-Ham Fighters.

He was traded to the Orix Blue Wave early in the 1998 season and retired after that season.

Fujimoto played a total of 1103 games, batting average .235 with a 715 hits, a 105 home runs, and a 419 RBI.

His active player era fight song is still the Hawks's chance theme (the song played during scoring chances) as of the 2022 season.

After retirement
Fujimoto ran a restaurant until 2010 while commentating on TVQ Kyushu Broadcasting's baseball broadcasts and critiquing Nishinippon Sports.

He has been the hitting coach for the second squad since the 2011 season and has served as the first squad hitting coach, second squad manager, and third squad manager before being named first squad manager for the 2022 season.

References

External links

 Career statistics - NPB.jp 
 81 Hiroshi Fujimoto PLAYERS2022 - Fukuoka SoftBank Hawks Official site

1963 births
Living people
Baseball people from Osaka Prefecture 
Japanese baseball players
Nippon Professional Baseball infielders
Nankai Hawks players
Fukuoka Daiei Hawks players
Orix BlueWave players
Managers of baseball teams in Japan
Fukuoka SoftBank Hawks managers